McArthurGlen Designer Outlet Vancouver Airport (commonly known as McArthurGlen Vancouver) is an outlet mall on Sea Island in Richmond, British Columbia. It is located in close proximity to Vancouver International Airport. It currently has around 80 retailers over 340,000 square feet.

Layout
McArthurGlen Vancouver Airport is an outdoor outlet lined with three horizontal pedestrian paths and three vertical pedestrian paths, which when intersected creates piazzas. The dining areas are located in the southeast corner of the outlet.

A phase two planned to open in 2018 was expected to expand the mall to 400,000 square feet and up to 150 retailers. However, the expansion was later scaled back to 84,000 square feet, eventually opening on August 29, 2019 just before the Labour Day weekend. Phase two was built to be integrated into the existing outlet centre, expanding on the European village theme to create one additional piazza.

The parking lot is single-leveled and spans from Templeton Street down to the west end of the outlet, providing 2,000 parking spaces.

Transportation
The outlet mall is served by the Templeton station on the airport branch of the Canada Line. Visitors can travel for free, both ways, between Vancouver Airport and the Mall by selecting a “Sea Island Only” ticket at the train stations.

References

Further reading
 The Globe and Mail
 Globalnews.ca
 Globalnews.ca
 The Vancouver Sun
 BC Business.
 The Georgia Straight

External links

McArthurGlen Designer Outlet @ YVR.ca

Buildings and structures in Richmond, British Columbia
Shopping malls in Metro Vancouver
Vancouver International Airport
Outlet malls in Canada
Power centres (retail) in Canada
Sea Island (British Columbia)
Shopping malls established in 2015
2015 establishments in British Columbia